Nicolás Barrientos (born 24 April 1987) is a Colombian professional tennis player competing mainly on the ATP Challenger Tour both in singles and doubles.

Barrientos reached his highest ATP singles ranking of world No. 237 on 21 September 2015 and his highest ATP doubles ranking of world No. 60 on 7 November 2022.

Barrientos also made his first appearance on an ATP World Tour in July 2013 when he lost in the first round of 2013 Claro Open Colombia against Ruben Bemelmans.

Doubles performance timeline

''Current till 2022 Wimbledon Championships – Men's doubles.

ATP career finals

Doubles: 3 (3 runner-ups)

ATP Challenger & ITF Futures

Singles: 10 (6–4)

Doubles: 41 (20–21)

National representation

Pan American Games

Singles 1 (1 runner-up)

Central American and Caribbean Games

Singles: 1 Bronze Medal Matches (1–0)

South American Games

Doubles 1 (1 runner-up)

Notes

References

External links 
 
 

1987 births
Living people
Colombian male tennis players
Tennis players at the 2015 Pan American Games
Pan American Games silver medalists for Colombia
Pan American Games medalists in tennis
Central American and Caribbean Games gold medalists for Colombia
South American Games silver medalists for Colombia
South American Games medalists in tennis
Competitors at the 2014 South American Games
Competitors at the 2014 Central American and Caribbean Games
Central American and Caribbean Games medalists in tennis
Medalists at the 2015 Pan American Games
West Florida Argonauts men's tennis players
21st-century Colombian people